Hetty van de Wouw (born 29 May 1998) is a Dutch female track cyclist, representing Netherlands at international competitions.

Major results
2014
1st Gent Junior Keirin
1st  National Track Junior Championships (500m time trial)

2015
2nd Gent Junior Keirin
European Track Junior Championships
3rd 500m time trial
3rd Scratch race

2016
European Track Junior Championships
1st  Team sprint
2nd Individual sprint
2nd 500m time trial
1st  National Track Championships (Keirin)
1st Dudenhofen Junior Individual sprint
1st Cottbus Junior Individual sprint
1st Oberhausen Junior Individual sprint
2nd Öschelbronn Junior Individual sprint
3rd World Track Junior Championships (Individual sprint)

2017
1st Keirin, Six Days of Rotterdam
2nd Team Sprint, Fastest Man on Wheels (with Kyra Lamberink)

References

1995 births
Living people
Dutch female cyclists
Dutch track cyclists
Cyclists at the 2019 European Games
European Games medalists in cycling
European Games bronze medalists for the Netherlands
21st-century Dutch women